Thomas Litscher (born 14 May 1989) is a Swiss cross-country mountain biker.

Major results

2007
 UCI World Championships
1st  Team relay
1st  Junior Cross-country
 UEC European Championships
1st  Junior Cross-country
1st  Team relay
2009
 UEC European Championships
2nd  Under-23 Cross-country
2nd  Team relay
2010
 UCI World Championships
1st  Team relay
2nd  Under-23 Cross-country
 1st  Team relay, UEC European Championships
2011
 UCI World Championships
1st  Under-23 Cross-country
2nd  Team relay
 UEC European Championships
2nd  Team relay
3rd  Under-23 Cross-country
2012
 1st  Eliminator, National Championships
 3rd  Cross-country, UCI World Under-23 Championships
2013
 2nd Eliminator, National Championships
2014
 3rd Eliminator, National Championships
2017
 3rd  Cross-country, UCI World Championships
2020
 3rd  Team relay, UCI World Championships
 3rd  Team relay, UEC European Championships 
2022
 UCI XCC World Cup
2nd Petrópolis
 3rd  Short track, UCI World Championships

References

1989 births
Living people
Swiss male cyclists
Swiss mountain bikers